The Jazy (also Яссы Yassy) is the largest right tributary of the Kara Darya in Kyrgyzstan. The river is formed at the south-west slope of Fergana Range. The river's length is 122 km, and its basin area is 2,620 km2. The annual average flow rate is 34.2 m3/s. It flows into the Andijan Reservoir, which is drained by the Kara Darya, west of the town Özgön. It flows along the towns Özgön, Myrza-Ake, Jylandy and Ak-Terek.

References 

Rivers of Kyrgyzstan
Tian Shan